Milan Jokić (born 21 March 1995) is a Serbian professional footballer who plays as a midfielder for Lithuanian club Sūduva.

Career
He joined Red Star Belgrade, from the youth categories of Partizan before the season 2013–14. He was loaned in BSK Borča and Kolubara, but he didn't play official match for Red Star Belgrade. He broke the contract and in winter break off-season 2014–15 moved in Voždovac.

In July 2022 he signed with lithuanian FK Sūduva.

References

External links
 
 Milan Jokić stats at utakmica.rs 
 

1995 births
Living people
People from Aranđelovac
Association football midfielders
Serbian footballers
Red Star Belgrade footballers
FK BSK Borča players
FK Kolubara players
FK Voždovac players
FK Borac Čačak players
FK Spartak Subotica players
FK Bežanija players
FK Zlatibor Čajetina players
FK Metalac Gornji Milanovac players
FC Tsarsko Selo Sofia players
Serbian First League players
Serbian SuperLiga players
First Professional Football League (Bulgaria) players